The Family Court of New Zealand is a court that specifically exists to assist New Zealanders with family issues. There are 58 Family Courts throughout New Zealand.

Although the Family Court is technically a division of the District Courts, it retains its own identity.

Role
The Family Court most commonly deals with issues relating to the welfare of children and relationship property division. It also deals with issues relating to births, deaths, marriage, and mental health.

Legislation

The Family Court deals with applications under the following legislation:

 Adoption Act 1955
 Adoption (Intercountry) Act 1997
 Alcoholism and Drug Addiction Act 1966
 Care of Children Act 2004
 Child Support Act 1991
 Civil Union Act 2004
 Family Violence Act 2018
 Family Proceedings Act 1980
 Family Protection Act 1955
 Intellectual Disability (Compulsory Care and Rehabilitation) Act 2003
 Law Reform (Testamentary Promises) Act 1949
 Marriage Act 1955
 Mental Health (Compulsory) Assessment and Treatment Act 1992
 Oranga Tamariki Act 1989
 Property (Relationships) Act 1976
 Protection of Personal and Property Rights Act 1988
 Wills Act 2007

See also
 District Court of New Zealand

References

External links
 Official website

New Zealand court system
1981 establishments in New Zealand
New Zealand family law
New Zealand
Courts and tribunals established in 1981